Molla Soltan (also Romanized as Mollā Solţān) is a village in Dust Mohammad Rural District, in the Central District of Hirmand County, Sistan and Baluchestan Province, Iran. At the 2006 census, its population was 371, in 95 families.

References 

Populated places in Hirmand County